Hannah Weiland (born 5 March 1990) is an English fashion designer. Weiland's brand, Shrimps was a finalist for the BFC/Vogue Designer Fashion Fund 2017. She started Shrimps in 2013 after attending The London College of Fashion.

Shrimps became famous for its signature faux fur coats, garnering support from animal rights activists such as PETA. The brand had regular presentations at London Fashion Week from their first season and beyond.
 Hannah is the daughter of film director, Paul Weiland.

She is married to Arthur Guinness.

References

Alumni of the University of Bristol
Living people
1990 births
English fashion designers
British women fashion designers